Tripoli Airport  is a military airbase situated in Tripoli, Greece, that started operating in 1973. It has a single lighted runway (02/20). It is used sparsely by the Hellenic Air Force. In the past it was also the base of the Arcadia Aeroclub. It also serves as a race track for dragster races.

References

External links

Airliners.gr Tripoli

Airports in Greece
Buildings and structures in Arcadia, Peloponnese
Hellenic Air Force bases
Tripoli, Greece
Transport infrastructure in Peloponnese (region)